Austrasiatica axelhuberti is a species of sea snail, a cowry, a marine gastropod mollusc in the family Cypraeidae, the cowries.

Description

Distribution

References

 Lorenz, F. and F. Huber. 2000. A new Nesiocypraea from the Andaman Sea. In: Lorenz, F. and A. Hubert, A Guide to Worldwide Cowries. 2nd. Edition, pp. 494–496. page(s): 494

External links

Cypraeidae
Gastropods described in 2000